F. L. Wandell, Estate and Ward Factory Site, is located in Saddle River, Bergen County, New Jersey, United States. The site was added to the National Register of Historic Places on November 1, 1990.    The house was completely gutted down to the wood frame around 2012.  The houses overall shape is the same, but the exterior appearance has been greatly altered for a more contemporary style of architecture from the home's original 1800s appearance.  Other major changes include the reorientation of the driveway and the addition of a swimming pool and various other aspects.  The photo displayed here on Wikipedia depicts the home after the 2012 renovation.  Whether any of the homes original interiors are still intact is unknown.  The original barn, which is now part of the neighboring parcel still has its original exterior.

The William Ward Edge Tool Factory was located on the F. L. Wandell Estate and manufactured tools from 1868 to 1890.

 
There was a murder/suicide at the estate on September 8th 1896.  While visiting for Labor Day from New York City, Frank Wandell's friend Issac Caryl was shot & killed in the Estate's massive horse barn by the Wandell family's coachmen William Dowling in a "fit of insanity".   Caryl was shot through the chest with a shot gun being killed almost instantly.   Dowling committed suicide shortly after, also in the barn.

See also
National Register of Historic Places listings in Bergen County, New Jersey

References

Buildings and structures in Bergen County, New Jersey
Industrial buildings and structures on the National Register of Historic Places in New Jersey
Industrial buildings completed in 1861
National Register of Historic Places in Bergen County, New Jersey
Saddle River, New Jersey
Shingle Style architecture in New Jersey
1861 establishments in New Jersey
New Jersey Register of Historic Places